Second to None is a 1927 British silent war film directed by Jack Raymond and starring Moore Marriott, Ian Fleming and Benita Hume. The screenplay concerns a naval family who come under strain when their son goes absent without leave to settle a domestic problem with his wife.

Cast
 Moore Marriott as Bill Hyde 
 Ian Fleming as Brian Douglas 
 Benita Hume as Ina 
 Mickey Brantford as Bill, as child 
 Aggie Brantford as Ina, as child 
 Alf Goddard as Curley 
 Johnny Butt as Tubby 
 A.B. Imeson as Levine 
 Daisy Campbell as Mrs Hyde 
 Tom Coventry as Old Lemon

References

Bibliography
 Low, Rachael. The History of the British Film 1918-1929. George Allen & Unwin, 1971.

External links

1927 films
British war films
British silent feature films
1927 war films
1920s English-language films
Films directed by Jack Raymond
Films set in England
British black-and-white films
1920s British films